Ilia Trilling (or Ilya Trilling) (1895–1947) was a German-born Yiddish Theatre producer, actor, and composer as well as a dance teacher. He was active in Poland, Ukraine and the United States.

Trilling was born in Elberfeld (now Wuppertal). He was able to obtain passage to America by being granted a passport by Russian authorities solely for Ilya Trilling and then getting a friend to change the word Ilya to "familya", meaning family in the native language. This forgery paid off and the entire family emigrated to America through Ellis Island, never to return to Europe. He continued his work in the Yiddish theater in America. His children and their offspring are still in the United States. They live in California, Pepper Pike, Ohio, Sharon, Massachusetts, Missouri, Florida, Colorado, North Carolina, and many other locations.

Works 
 Zog, Zog, Zog Es Mir (Tell Me, Say It to Me)
 Du Shaynst Vi Di Zun (You Shine Like the Sun)

References

External links 
 Ilia Trilling at the Milken Archive of American Jewish Music

1895 births
1947 deaths
Musicians from Wuppertal
American male composers
German composers
German emigrants to the United States
19th-century German Jews
German theatre managers and producers
Jewish American composers
Yiddish theatre
20th-century American composers
20th-century German musicians
20th-century American male musicians
20th-century American Jews